"Megalomaniac" is a song by industrial rock band KMFDM from the album commonly referred to as Symbols. It was released in various forms in late 1997 and early 1998. The song peaked at #22 on Billboard's Bubbling Under 100 chart, the band's only appearance on the chart. The associated music video featured a then-unknown, and only 17 year old Kelly Brook. A 7" vinyl version was released in 2009.

The song was also used in the film Mortal Kombat: Annihilation in the end credits and in the 1998 racing video game Test Drive 5, along with an instrumental version in the latter.

Track listings
All songs composed by KMFDM.

Megalomaniac Remixes (1997)
This version was also split into two separate records, with two songs on each.

MDFMK (1998)

7" reissue (2009)

References

1998 singles
KMFDM songs
TVT Records singles
1998 songs
Wax Trax! Records singles
Songs written by Sascha Konietzko
Songs written by Günter Schulz
Songs written by En Esch